African-American newspapers (also known as the Black press or Black newspapers) are news publications in the United States serving African-American communities. Samuel Cornish and John Brown Russwurm started the first African-American periodical called Freedom's Journal in 1827. During the antebellum South, other African-American newspapers sprang forth, such as The North Star founded in 1847 by Frederick Douglass.

As African Americans moved to urban centers around the country, virtually every large city with a significant African-American population soon had newspapers directed towards African Americans. These newspapers gained audiences outside African-American circles. In the 21st century, papers (like newspapers of all sorts) have shut down, merged, or shrunk in response to the dominance of the Internet in terms of providing free news and information, and providing cheap advertising.

History

Origins
Most of the early African-American publications, such as Freedom's Journal, were published in the North and then distributed, often covertly, to African Americans throughout the country. By the 20th century, daily papers appeared in Norfolk, Chicago, Baltimore and Washington, D.C.

19th century
Some notable black newspapers of the 19th century were Freedom's Journal (1827–1829), Philip Alexander Bell's Colored American (1837–1841), the North Star (1847–1860), the National Era, Frederick Douglass' Paper (1851–1863), the Douglass Monthly (1859–1863), The People's Advocate, founded by John Wesley Cromwell and Travers Benjamin Pinn (1876–1891), The Christian Recorder (1861–1902).

In the 1860s, the newspapers The Elevator and the Pacific Appeal emerged in California as a result of black participation in the Gold Rush.

In 1885, Daniel Rudd formed the Ohio Tribune, said to be the first newspaper "printed by and for Black Americans", which he later expanded into the American Catholic Tribune, purported to the first Black-owned national newspaper.

The American Freedman was a New York-based paper that served as an outlet to inspire African Americans to use the Reconstruction period as a time for social and political advancement. This newspaper did so by publishing articles that reference African-American mobilization during the Reconstruction period that had not only local support but had gained support from the global community as well.

Many African-American newspapers struggled to keep their circulation going due to the low rate of literacy among African Americans. Many freed African Americans had low incomes and could not afford to purchase subscriptions but shared the publications with one another.

The national Afro-American Press Association was formed in 1890 in Indianapolis.

20th century

African-American newspapers flourished in the major cities, with publishers playing a major role in politics and business affairs. Representative leaders included Robert Sengstacke Abbott (1870–1940) and John H. Sengstacke (1912–1997) publishers of the Chicago Defender; John Mitchell Jr. (1863–1929), editor of the Richmond Planet and president of the National Afro-American Press Association; Anthony Overton (1865–1946), publisher of the Chicago Bee, Garth C. Reeves Sr. (1919–2019), publisher emeritus of the Miami Times and Robert Lee Vann (1879–1940), the publisher and editor of the Pittsburgh Courier. In the 1940s the number of newspapers grew from 150 to 250.

From 1881 to 1909, the National Colored Press Association (American Press Association) operated as a trade association. The National Negro Business League-affiliated National Negro Press Association filled that role from 1909 to 1939. The Chicago-based Associated Negro Press (1919–1964) was a subscription news agency "with correspondents and stringers in all major centers of black population". In 1940, Sengstacke led African American newspaper publishers in forming the trade association known in the 21st century as the National Newspaper Publishers Association.

During the 1930s and 1940s, the Black southern press both aided and, to an extent, hindered the equal payment movement of Black teachers in the southern United States. Newspaper coverage of the movement served to publicize the cause. However, the way in which the movement was portrayed, and those whose struggles were highlighted in the press, displaced Black women to the background of a movement they spearheaded. A woman's issue, and a Black woman's issue, was being covered by the press. However, reporting diminished the roles of the women fighting for teacher salary equalization and “diminished the presence of the teachers’ salary equalization fight” in national debates over equality in education.

There were many specialized black publications, such as those of Marcus Garvey and John H. Johnson. These men broke a wall that let black people into society. The Roanoke Tribune was founded in 1939 by Fleming Alexander, and recently celebrated its 75th anniversary. The Minnesota Spokesman-Recorder is Minnesota's oldest black newspaper and one of the United States' oldest ongoing minority publication, second only to The Jewish World.

21st century
Many Black newspapers that began publishing in the 1960s, 1970s, and 1980s went out of business because they could not attract enough advertising. They were also victims of their own substantial efforts to eradicate racism and promote civil rights. , about 200 Black newspapers remained. With the decline of print media and proliferation of internet access, more black news websites emerged, most notably Black Voice News, The Grio, The Root, and Black Voices.

See also

 African-American businesses
 List of African-American newspapers and media outlets
 List of newspapers in the United States

References

Further reading
 Bacon, Jacqueline. Freedom's journal: the first African-American newspaper (Lexington Books, 2007)
 Belles, A. Gilbert. "The Black Press in Illinois." Journal of the Illinois State Historical Society (1975): 344–352. online
 Bradshaw, Katherine A. "Eye on the Struggle: Ethel Payne, the First Lady of the Black Press." Journalism History 41.1 (2015): 53+
 
 Bullock, Penelope L. The Afro-American Periodical Press, 1838–1909 (LSU Press, 1981).
 
 Burma, John H. "An analysis of the present Negro Press." Social forces (1947): 172–180. in JSTOR
 Dann, Martin E. The Black Press, 1827–1890: The Quest for National Identity (1972).
 Davis, Ralph N. "The Negro Newspapers and the War." Sociology and Social Research 27 (1943): 378–380.
 
  (includes US)
 Eldridge, Lawrence Allen. Chronicles of a Two-front War: Civil Rights and Vietnam in the African American Press (University of Missouri Press, 2012)
 
 Finkle, Lee. Forum for protest: The black press during World War II (Fairleigh Dickinson University Press, 1975)
 
 Gershenhorn, Jerry. Louis Austin and the Carolina Times: A Life in the Long Black Freedom Struggle. Chapel Hill: University of North Carolina Press, 2018.
 Guskin, Emily, Paul Moore, and Amy Mitchell. "African American media: Evolving in the new era." in The State of the News Media 2011 (2011).
 Henritze, Barbara K. Bibliographic Checklist of African American Newspapers (Genealogical Publishing Com, 1995)
 Hogan, Lawrence D. A black national news service: the Associated Negro Press and Claude Barnett, 1919–1945 (Fairleigh Dickinson Univ Press, 1984)
 Jones, Allen W. "The Black Press in The" New South": Jesse C. Duke's Struggle for Justice and Equality." Journal of Negro History 64.3 (1979): 215–228. in JSTOR
 La Brie, Henry G. A survey of Black newspapers in America (Mercer House Press, 1973).
 Meier, August. "Booker T. Washington and the Negro Press: With Special Reference to the Colored American Magazine." Journal of Negro History (1953): 67–90. in JSTOR
 Morris, James McGrath. Eye on the Struggle: Ethel Payne, the First Lady of the Black Press (New York: Amistad, 2015). xii, 466 pp.
 Oak, Vishnu Vitthal. The Negro Newspaper (Greenwood, 1970)
 Odum-Hinmon, Maria E. "The Cautious Crusader: How the Atlanta Daily World Covered the Struggle for African American Rights from 1945 to 1985." (PhD Dissertation University of Maryland, 2005). 
 
 
 Prides, Armistead S. A Register and History of Negro Newspapers in the United States: 1827–1950. (1950)
 Simmons, Charles A. The African American press: a history of news coverage during national crises, with special reference to four black newspapers, 1827–1965 (McFarland, 2006).
 Stevens, John D. "Conflict-cooperation content in 14 Black newspapers." Journalism Quarterly 47#3 (1970): 566–568.
 Strickland, Arvarh E., and Robert E. Weems, eds. The African American Experience: An Historiographical and Bibliographical Guide (Greenwood, 2001), pp. 216–230, with long bibliography
 Suggs, Henry Lewis, ed. The Black press in the south, 1865–1979 (Praeger, 1983).
 Suggs, Henry Lewis, ed. The Black Press in the Middle West, 1865–1985 (Greenwood Press, 1996). 416 pp.
 Wade-Gayles, Gloria. "Black Women Journalists in the South, 1880–1905: An Approach to the Study of Black Women's History." Callaloo 11/13 (1981): 138–152. in JSTOR
 Washburn, Patrick S. The African American Newspaper: Voice of Freedom (Northwestern University Press, 2006); covers 1827–1900; emphasis on Pittsburgh Courier and the Chicago Defender
 Washburn, Patrick Scott. A question of sedition: The federal government's investigation of the black press during World War II (Oxford University Press, 1986).
 Wolseley, Roland Edgar. The black press, USA (Wiley-Blackwell, 1990).

Primary sources
 Dunnigan, Alice. Alone Atop the Hill: The Autobiography of Alice Dunnigan, Pioneer of the National Black Press (University of Georgia Press, 2015)
 La Brie, Henry G. III, Black Pulitzers and Hearsts, oral history collection at Columbia University's Butler Library with over 80 interviews with Black publishers and editors

External links
 List of black-owned newspapers in the United States
 African-American Newspapers 1829 to present
 Black Press USA: List of local newspapers

 
Newspapers
Newspapers
Newspapers